Raccoon Township may refer to the following places:
 Raccoon Township, Marion County, Illinois
 Raccoon Township, Parke County, Indiana
 Raccoon Township, Gallia County, Ohio
 Raccoon Township, Beaver County, Pennsylvania

See also 
 Raccoon (disambiguation)

Township name disambiguation pages